CCGS Caporal Kaeble V.C. is the second of nine s to be delivered to the Canadian Coast Guard. Entering service in 2013, the vessel is based at Quebec City and tasked with enforcing Canadian maritime law within Canada's borders.

Description
The patrol vessel is also equipped with two Northern Lights M1066 generators and one Northern Lights M1064 emergency generator. The ship has a complement of nine with five officers and four crew and has five additional berths. The ship is equipped with Sperry Marine Visionmaster FT navigational radar operating on the X and S-bands.

Service history
The ship was ordered from Irving Shipbuilding in 2009 and the ship's keel was laid down at Halifax Shipyards in Halifax, Nova Scotia with the yard number 6095. The ship was launched on 22 September 2012, christened by Denis Lebel, the Minister of Infrastructure, Communities and Intergovernmental Affairs and Minister of the Economic Development Agency of Canada for the Regions of Quebec and completed in November of that year. Caporal Kaeble V.C. entered service in 2013 and was based at Quebec City, Quebec. The vessel is named after Joseph Kaeble, a winner of the Victoria Cross in the First World War.

References

Sources
 

Hero-class patrol vessels
2012 ships
Ships built in Nova Scotia
Patrol vessels of the Canadian Coast Guard